The 2009 Philippine Collegiate Championship was the second tournament of the Philippine Collegiate Championship (PCC) for basketball in its current incarnation, and the seventh edition overall. The champion teams from the University Athletic Association of the Philippines (UAAP), National Collegiate Athletic Association (NCAA), the Cebu Schools Athletic Foundation, Inc. (CESAFI) and 3 other Metro Manila leagues took part in the final tournament dubbed as the "Sweet Sixteen". Other teams had to qualify in the zonal tournaments to round out the 16 teams in the tournament.

The Ateneo Blue Eagles defeated the FEU Tamaraws in the championship; the San Beda Red Lions and the San Sebastian Stags disputed third place, with San Beda winning.

ABS-CBN Sports was the coverage partner, with games airing on Studio 23.

Tournament format
Top 4 teams from the NCAA and the UAAP and the CESAFI qualify automatically to the national quarterfinals.
Fifth to sixth teams from the NCAA and UAAP qualify to the zonal qualifying games.
Champions from regional league qualify to the regional championship.
Best teams from the regional championship qualify for the zonal qualifying games.
Best seven teams from the zonal qualifying games qualify to the national quarterfinals
Teams are seeded 1 to 16th at the national quarterfinals in a single elimination format up to the Finals, which is a best-of-3 format, with a playoff for third.

Qualifying

Automatic qualifiers

Zonal qualifiers

Zonal qualifying

Bacolod zonal

Cebu City zonal

Intramuros, Manila zonal

Note: UM forfeited their Round of 16 place in favor of Lyceum as it was disqualified for fielding players who were not in the regular-season lineup.

San Miguel, Manila zonal

Naga zonal

Bracket

Finals
The Finals is a best-of-3 series. The team that wins two games first is named the champion.

Awards
The awardees are:
Most Valuable Player: Jai Reyes (Ateneo)
Mythical Five:
Eric Salamat (Ateneo)
Jai Reyes (Ateneo)
RR Garcia (FEU)
Bambam Gamalinda (San Beda)
Aldrech Ramos (FEU)
Best Coach: Norman Black (Ateneo)
Best Referee: Buddy Cortez

References

External links
Collegiate Champions League official website

2009
2009–10 in Philippine basketball leagues